Nikita Supranovich (born 3 September 2000) is a Belarusian professional footballer who plays for Belshina Bobruisk on loan from BATE Borisov.

Honours
BATE Borisov
Belarusian Cup winner: 2020–21

References

External links 
 
 

2001 births
Living people
People from Vileyka District
Sportspeople from Minsk Region
Belarusian footballers
Association football defenders
FC BATE Borisov players
FC Zenit-2 Saint Petersburg players
FC Arsenal Dzerzhinsk players
FC Belshina Bobruisk players
Belarusian Premier League players
Russian Second League players
Belarusian expatriate footballers
Expatriate footballers in Russia